This article contains a partial list of notable events occurring in the year 1875 in Ecuador.

Incumbents
President: Gabriel García Moreno until August 6, Rafael Carvajal
Vice President: Francisco Xavier León

Events
August 6 - President Garcio Moreno is assassinated by Faustino Rayo and three others. Rayo is shot and killed the same day by police.

Births

Deaths
August 6
Gabriel García Moreno, president, assassination
Faustino Rayo, assassin of President Garcia Moreno, shot in police custody

 
1870s in Ecuador